The First Secretary of the Central Committee of the Communist Party of Latvia was the leader of the Communist Party of Latvia, which was in turn a branch of the Communist Party of the Soviet Union.

Below is a list of office-holders:

Footnotes

Sources 
World Statesmen – Latvian Soviet Socialist Republic

Politics of Latvia
Latvian SSR
Lists of political office-holders in Latvia
List
List